Ushkatty is a village in Aktobe Region, in the western part of Kazakhstan.

References

Populated places in Aktobe Region